STMIK Kharisma Karawang is the first College in Karawang and they are already using the free open source software in the academic (theory & practice). Established by Yayasan Pendidikan Kharisma '92 Karawang on August 10, 2000.

History
STMIK Kharisma Karawang officially established on August 10, 2000 by the Decree of Minister of National Education (Menteri Pendidikan Nasional) of the Republic of Indonesia No. 151/D/0/2000. Originally Yayasan Pendidikan Kharisma 92 Karawang established the Academy of Informatics Management and Computer (Akademi Manajemen Informatika dan Komputer) Kharisma Karawang on March 20, 1995. Then, based on a recommendation from Kopertis Wilayah IV Jawa Barat No. 1790a/Kop.IV/N/1995 give permission for the AMIK Kharisma Karawang to occupy lecture building at Jl. Melati No. 23 Guro II Karawang and first generation students had had only one study program, namely is Informatics Management.

On December 27, 1995, the Minister of National Education (Menteri Pendidikan Nasional) of the Republic of Indonesia released Decree No. 094/D/0/1995 about permission and registered status in the DIKTI.

Then in the second year, 1996, the Director of AMIK Kharisma of the Minister of Education and Culture (Menteri Pendidikan dan Kebudayaan) of the Republic of Indonesia released Decree No. 223/RHS/MPK/1996 as Tenaga Dosen Kopertis from DPK become PTS.

In the third year, 1997, AMIK Kharisma Karawang occupy the campus / new building owned by Yayasan Pendidikan Kharisma 92 Karawang located at Jl. Pangkal Perjuangan Km. 1 By Pass Karawang.

In the fourth year, in 1998, the Directorate General of Higher Education (Pendidikan Tinggi) of the Department of Education and Culture (Departemen Pendidikan dan Kebudayaan) of the Republic of Indonesia released Decree No. 448/DIKTI/Kep/1998 about the Granting of Status Registered to both the Study Program, Computerized Accounting and Computer Engineering (Komputerisasi Akuntansi dan Teknik Komputer). Starting from the fourth year AMIK Kharisma has three study programs have been registered, namely is Informatics Management, Computerized Accounting, and Computer Engineering (Manajemen Informatika, Komputerisasi Akuntansi, dan Teknik Komputer).

Based on the Decree of the Ministry of National Education (Menteri Pendidikan Nasional) of the Republic of Indonesia No. 151/D/0/2000 about changes in the status of the Akademi Manajemen Informatika dan Komputer (AMIK) Kharisma into College of Informatics Management and Computer (Sekolah Tinggi Manajemen Informatika dan Komputer) Kharisma and the Study Program is composed of:

 Study Program Computerized Accounting (Komputerisasi Akuntansi) - (D3);
 Study Program Informatics Management (Manajemen Informatika) - (D3);
 Study Program Information System (Sistem Informasi) - (S1); and
 Study Program Informatics Engineering (Teknik Informatika) - (S1).

Caused by Autonomy Campus, the government changed assessment of the College (Perguruan Tinggi) by Status to Accredited by The National Accreditation Board of College (Badan Akreditasi Nasional Perguruan Tinggi / BAN-PT).
Till now all the study programs at STMIK Kharisma has been accredited.

References 
Direktori Perguruan Tinggi Swasta Kopertis Wilayah IV

External links 
  Official Site STMIK Kharisma Karawang
  Official Site Wiki STMIK Kharisma Karawang

Universities in Indonesia
2000 establishments in Indonesia
Universities in West Java